Maurice Parry (7 November 1877 – 24 March 1935) was a Welsh international footballer who played for Liverpool in the early 20th century, helping them to two Football League Championships.

Playing career
Born in Trefonen, Oswestry, Parry played for Newtown, Long Eaton Rangers, Leicester Fosse (who became Leicester City in 1919), Loughborough and the short-lived Brighton United before being signed by Liverpool manager Tom Watson in March 1900 making his debut in a Football League Division One match on 13 October the same year, a game which the Reds won 2-1 against Bolton at Anfield, he had to wait until the April fool's day 1904 before he scored his first goal, it came in the Merseyside derby against Everton a game that saw the Reds slump to a 5-2 defeat. The right-half never really established himself as a 'first choice' player during his 9-year Liverpool career but he still managed 222 appearances for the Reds helping them to 2 Football League First Division Championships, unfortunately not playing enough times to earn a medal for the 1901 title win. After leaving the club in May 1909, Parry along with the then Liverpool captain Alex Raisbeck joined Scottish side Partick. He would join Wrexham in 1910 before emigrating to South Africa in 1911.

Parry played for Wales on 14 occasions making his debut against Ireland on 23 March 1901 in a British Championship match.

Coaching and management career
After leaving Thistle Parry went into coaching and got a post in South Africa but moved back to Oswestry to take up a role with Oswestry Town. Parry then, like many others, was affected by the First World War where he was badly gassed during military service on the Balkans theatre, but he returned to his passion after the war taking the managerial post at Rotherham County, who later merged with Rotherham Town to form Rotherham United in 1925. Parry then took up coaching roles with the more impressive clubs of Barcelona in Spain and both Eintracht Frankfurt and 1. FC Köln in Germany before returning to the British Isles taking up a coaching role on the Channel Islands.

Family
Parry's brother Thomas was also a Wales international: the two brothers played together for their country four times. His son, Frank, was also a professional footballer and made over 100 appearances in the Football League.

References

External links
Player profile at LFChistory.net
Maurice Parry at eintracht-archiv.de

1877 births
Sportspeople from Oswestry
1935 deaths
Association football wing halves
Southern Football League players
Leicester City F.C. players
Brighton United F.C. players
Liverpool F.C. players
Liverpool F.C. non-playing staff
Partick Thistle F.C. players
Wrexham A.F.C. players
Welsh footballers
Wales international footballers
Eintracht Frankfurt managers
Expatriate football managers in Germany
Welsh football managers
Welsh expatriate football managers
Welsh expatriate sportspeople in Germany
Oswestry United F.C. players